Cladiella australis is a species of soft coral in the family Alcyoniidae. It is found in the western Indo-Pacific. It is commonly known as the finger blanching soft coral because with the polyps extended it appears brown but when poked with a finger, the polyps retract into the leathery base tissue and the coral appears white.

Secondary metabolites
Five new diterpenes with tricyclic skeletons of cladiellin have been isolated from this soft coral.

References

Alcyoniidae
Animals described in 1936